Mikhail Valeryevich Nestruyev (born 28 October 1968 in Moscow) is a pistol shooter from Moscow, Russia. He is an all-round shooter, having achieved great successes in all five ISSF pistol events. He holds the 25 metre center-fire pistol world record of 594. He also shares the European record in 25 metre standard pistol with Ragnar Skanåker and Vladas Turla, and has performed over 580 at several occasions.

Nestruyev has also excelled in the Olympic events. In the 2004 Olympics after setting a new Olympic record in qualification he lost a close final to Wang Yifu in 10 metre air pistol, but a few days later took the gold in the 50 metre pistol event. He also won the ISSF World Shooting Championships in 1998 (25 metre standard pistol) and 2002 (10 metre air pistol), and has many other medals from World and European Championships in all four events, and has won four consecutive ISSF World Cup Finals in Air Pistol (2002-2005).

Starting late as a 25 metre rapid fire pistol shooter, Nestruyev qualified for the Russian team at the 2009 European Championships, where he won the silver medal.

Holding the rank of lieutenant colonel, Nestruyev has also competed successfully for several years in international military competitions.

Olympic results

Records

Gallery

External links
 Nestruyev's profile at ISSF

1968 births
Living people
Russian male sport shooters
Olympic shooters of Russia
Shooters at the 2000 Summer Olympics
Shooters at the 2004 Summer Olympics
Shooters at the 2008 Summer Olympics
Olympic gold medalists for Russia
Olympic silver medalists for Russia
ISSF pistol shooters
World record holders in shooting
Sportspeople from Moscow
Olympic medalists in shooting
Medalists at the 2004 Summer Olympics